Jet was an Australian rock band, formed in Melbourne, Victoria in 2001. For most of the band's tenure, it consisted of lead guitarist and vocalist Cameron Muncey, bassist Mark Wilson, and brothers Nic (vocals, rhythm guitar, piano) and Chris Cester (drums, vocals). The group sold 6.5 million albums worldwide, releasing three studio albums: 2003's Get Born, 2006's Shine On and 2009's Shaka Rock. The band dissolved in 2012, but they reformed in 2016 for a run of shows and then split again at the end of 2019.

History

Formation and Dirty Sweet (2001–2003)
The Cester brothers grew up in Dingley Village, a south-eastern suburb of Melbourne, Victoria, and attended St Bede's College Mentone, listening to their father's classic rock records from the 1960s and 1970s.

However, according to Nic, it was Australian band You Am I who had the biggest influence on Jet's developing musical tastes:

The brothers decided to form a band with Cameron Muncey, Nic's friend and previous bandmate, and with bassist Doug Armstrong whom Nic and Chris met while working together at their father's spice factory. During 2001. an old high-school friend of Chris's joined the band on keyboard, and it was at this time that the band took their current name. They wanted a short name so when it showed up on festival advertisements, it would be large and bold in print. "Radio Song", from their album Get Born, was written about the troubles that the band had getting recognition at this time. Jet got their big break when seminal Melbourne Punk rock band The Specimens took Jet under their wing and put them on as an opening act at The Duke of Windsor. This is where Dave Powell first saw the band perform and went on to sign them to his management firm Majorbox.

The new band met Mark Wilson one night in 2002 at a concert and, despite already having a bass player, asked him to play with them. Wilson was then the bassist in a band called The CA$inos, so he initially declined. However, a few days later he called the band and said he would like to join them instead.

In 2002, the band released the Dirty Sweet EP, whose initial 1000 copies quickly sold out. NME obtained a copy of the single from Dirty Sweet, "Take It or Leave It", and praised it. Elektra Records offered the band a contract and re-released Dirty Sweet in 2003.

Get Born (2003–2005)

Jet entered the Sunset Sound Studios in Los Angeles with Dave Sardy to produce their debut album Get Born. Sardy had previously produced records for Marilyn Manson and The Dandy Warhols. They also enlisted the services of keyboard maestro Billy Preston for two of the songs. The album derived its name from the blockbuster action movie, The Bourne Identity, starring Matt Damon as Jason Bourne. Halfway through recording, the band received a call from The Rolling Stones offering them a support slot on the Australian leg of their 2003 tour. Jet played more than 200 shows in 2003.

Their singles "Are You Gonna Be My Girl" and "Rollover DJ" were voted number one and number nineteen, respectively, on the 2003 Triple J Hottest 100. "Are You Gonna Be My Girl" appeared on the soundtracks for the video games Madden NFL 2004, Guitar Hero: On Tour, Rock Band, and Strictly Come Dancing; the 2006 animated film Flushed Away; the live-action films Eurotrip and What Happens in Vegas; and as part of two major worldwide advertising campaigns for Vodafone and Apple's iPod and iMac. "Rollover DJ" features on the soundtrack to PlayStation 2 game Gran Turismo 4. Get Born also includes the song "Timothy", dedicated to deceased brother of vocalist/guitarist Cameron Muncey, who died before Cameron was born. Due to the sensitive nature of the song, the band rarely played "Timothy" live.

In early 2004, Jet teamed up with The Vines and The Living End on "the Aussie invasion" tour of US cities. A new Jet song not included on Get Born, called "Hold On", was featured on the Spider-Man 2 soundtrack that year. TV/film producer J. J. Abrams – whose credits include Lost and Felicity – contacted Jet to record a song for the Season 4 premiere to his show Alias. "Cold Hard Bitch" from Get Born was used, and became the soundtrack to a frenetic scene of two CIA agents sprinting down a Hong Kong street, giving Jet further US exposure.

Later the same year, Jet received nominations for the annual Radio Music Awards, including 'Artist of the Year: Rock Radio', 'Artist of the Year: Rock Alternative Radio', and 'Song of the Year: Rock Radio' (for "Cold Hard Bitch"). Still in the U.S. Jet received the 32nd Annual American Music Awards nomination as 'Favorite Artist – Alternative Music', as well as three nominations for the 2004 MTV Video Music Awards, held in Miami in August. "Are You Gonna Be My Girl" was nominated for Best Rock Video, Best New Artist and Best Editing in a video. Jet performed "Are You Gonna Be My Girl" live at the ceremony and picked up the award for Best Rock Video, dedicating the award to Chris and Nic's late father John Cester. Following their success in Miami, back home in Australia the band was nominated in seven categories at the 2004 ARIA (Australian Record Industry Association) Music Awards, receiving nominations in a stunning seven categories; 'Album of the Year', 'Single of the Year' (for "Are You Gonna Be My Girl"), 'Best Group', 'Best Rock Album', 'Breakthrough Artist – Album', 'Breakthrough Artist – Single' (for "Are You Gonna Be My Girl"), and 'Highest Selling Album'. At the awards ceremony on 17 October 2004, Jet dominated the ceremony receiving six awards out of the seven nominations. Nic Cester also performed as part of supergroup The Wrights, featuring members of other Australian rock bands Spiderbait (Kram, drums), The Living End (Chris Cheney, guitar), Dallas Crane (Pat Bourke, bass) and You Am I/The Pictures (Davey Lane, guitar).

During a show at the MCG in October 2005, founder Nic Cester declared loudly between songs that he considered Jet to be 'up there with the greatests, with f**king Lennon and the Stones'. This caused considerable controversy but was soon settled when Australian music magazines began publishing articles comparing Jet albums with those of famous 60s and 70s bands.

Shine On (2006–2008)
The debut single from the band's second album, Shine On, titled "Put Your Money Where Your Mouth Is", was released to radio on 7 August 2006. Shine On was released on 30 September 2006 (2 October in the UK, 3 October in the US) with a final track listing of 15 songs, but with an extra sixteenth track, titled "Coming Home Soon", available only on the ITunes Store. It debuted at No. 3 on the Australian charts. Critical reaction to the album was mixed, with British music magazine NME calling the record "another joyfully old-fashioned rock'n'roll album immersed in the classics." but influential American music blog Pitchfork gave the album 0 out of 10 stars, posting a video of a chimpanzee urinating in its own mouth in place of a review. The song also appeared on NMEs compilation CD, NME: The Essential Bands – Festival Edition.

"Put Your Money Where Your Mouth Is" appeared on the "Chuck (TV series)" pilot episode; Season 1 Episode 1 "Chuck Versus the Intersect".

Jet played at the MTV Europe Awards in Copenhagen. It was their first live performance since Nic Cester's laryngitis halted their World Tour. In November 2006 Jet flew back to Australia to perform at the Make Poverty History Concert in Melbourne at the Sidney Myer Music Bowl; upon their return they also held a secret show on a barge floating on the Yarra River. The second singles from the album, "Bring It on Back" (in the UK) and "Rip It Up" (in Australia) were released in November 2006. The album also spawned an EP, the Shine On EP released December 2006.

The title track, "Shine On", was released on various dates in March 2007 around the world as the third single (second single in some countries). The song is a tribute to Nic and Chris Cester's father, who died from cancer in 2004. It was written by Nic Cester from the perspective of his father encouraging those who survive him to "shine on". Many songs on the album ("Come On Come On", "Bring It on Back", "Stand Up", "Holiday", "All You Have to Do") are primarily about overcoming adversity and challenge.

Jet co-headlined a series of shows during the 2007 Big Day Out festival in Australia and New Zealand, with acts Tool, Muse, The Killers, and My Chemical Romance. The band played their Rip It Up Oz tour in late May and June 2007, which was supported by Channel V. Also in 2007, they released a new song for the Spider-Man 3 soundtrack titled "Falling Star". In addition, their song "Rip It Up" appeared on the TMNT soundtrack. It also became the official theme for the wrestling show WWE Summerslam. In August, the band was again asked to support The Rolling Stones on the European leg of their World Tour. Jet played multiple support slots for the Stones in both Spain and London's O2 Arena.

In October 2007, the band returned to Australia to perform at the AFL Grand Final and to finish the rest of their world tour. They announced on their website that they would begin production on their third studio album, due for a 2008 release. However, in November, the band announced they would take "some time off". They stated that after touring for Shine On they needed some "down time". On 24 October Chris and Mark produced a song, under the name "The Vice Lords" for the Japanese former duo Superfly titled "I Spy I Spy".

Shaka Rock and disbandment (2009–2012)
In a video on their website, the band talked about writing and recording songs at Atlantic Sound Studios in New York City. Chris Cester cheated: "We've got to stop writing; we got too many songs." They also collaborated with Iggy Pop to release a cover of the Johnny O'Keefe single "Wild One". Jet returned to Australia to play a secret show in Melbourne on 17 December to debut new material, including new songs titled "Goodbye Hollywood", "Walk", "Start The Show", "Black Hearts", "She's a Genius", "Seventeen", and "Beat On Repeat". Guitarist Cameron Muncey particularly expressed that he "really, really loves the song 'Seventeen'." Said Cameron of the song, "I think is sort of a step forward for us songwriting-wise. It's sorta got everything wrapped into one, a storyline, and sad to say melancholy. It's rock and roll, it's rocking, it's got all these other albums to it, you know, so I find it really interesting."

Jet played at the Melbourne Cricket Ground and the Sydney Cricket Ground on 14 March 2009 for Sound Relief, which was a multi-venue rock music concert in support of relief for the Victorian Bushfire Crisis. The event was held simultaneously with a concert at the Sydney Cricket Ground. All the proceeds from the Melbourne Concert went to the Red Cross Victorian Bushfire relief. Half the proceeds from the Sydney concert went to the Victorian Bushfire relief and the other half for Queensland Flood relief. Appearing with Jet at the Sydney concert were Coldplay, Eskimo Joe, Hoodoo Gurus, Icehouse, Josh Pyke, Little Birdy, The Presets, Wolfmother, You Am I, and additional artists. Jet and Wolfmother were the only bands to perform at both venues.

Jet's song, "She's a Genius" from this album, appeared on a NCIS episode; Season 7 Episode 2 – "Reunion". In April 2009, a song titled "K.I.A (Killed in Action)" was made available to listen to on the band's official website. "Killed in Action" was the 5th most added song to radio in Australia. "She's a Genius" was the first single released from the album on 19 June 2009. The new album was titled Shaka Rock and was released in Australia on 21 August 2009:it has been certified gold in Australia in 2009.

"Black Hearts (On Fire)" was released as the second single from the album on 2 November 2009 with a music video filmed for the single. Black Hearts also appeared in the Australian film adaptation of Tomorrow, When the War Began. On 8 November 2009 She's a Genius was certified Gold by the Australian Record Industry Association (ARIA) for selling more than 35,000 shipments.

Jet was featured on the album Shock Value II by American record producer Timbaland. The song was titled "Timothy (Where Have You Been)".

In December 2009, Jet was the support act for punk rock trio Green Day on the Australian leg of their 21st Century Breakdown World Tour.

"Seventeen" was released as the third single from Shaka Rock in April 2010, climbing up to No. 31 on the Australian Singles Chart in its 5th week on the chart. In October 2010 it was certified Gold in Australia with shipments of over 35 000 copies.

During April 2010, the band also appeared on Hey Hey It's Saturday's first episode since the reunion series, for a broadcast performance of "She's a Genius" and "Seventeen".

Throughout September to November 2010, Jet extensively toured Australia as the supporting act for Powderfinger's Sunsets Farewell Tour.

While Nic Cester and Cameron Muncey were on a hiatus from the band, Wilson and Chris Cester formed a 'doom-disco' band named the DAMNDOGS, and released their debut EP Strange Behaviour on 9 August 2011 via iTunes.

On 26 March 2012, Jet announced their 'discontinuation as a group,' via the band's website and Facebook:

Reformation (2016–2019)
In 2016, it was announced that Jet would be reforming and in 2017 opening five dates for Bruce Springsteen and the E Street Band on their "Summer '17" tour. It was then announced in October that Jet would play their first headline show in 6 years at Sydney's Taronga Zoo in February 2017. The show subsequently sold out, with a second added.

Jet made their official live return at a one-off headlining show at Melbourne's Gasometer Hotel on 31 January 2017. The band performed with previous keyboardist Louis Macklin, and played a 23-song setlist that drew from all three of their studio albums.

In 2018, Jet announced a 15th anniversary Australian national tour for their album Get Born, including dates in Newcastle, Sydney, Canberra, Brisbane, Perth, Adelaide and Melbourne. They also issued the live album Get Born: Live at the Forum to commemorate the tour. They then embarked on a mini UK tour, playing Manchester and London. The band toured as Jimmy Barnes' opener in 2019, and played their final show to date at the By The C open-air concert in Coffs Harbour on October 26, 2019.

Nic Cester resumed his solo career, releasing the album The Skipping Girl in 2021. The album was a companion piece to Cester's first children's book. Cester also released an album as part of the supergroup The Jaded Hearts Club, entitled You've Always Been Here, in October 2020.

Wilson began performing as part of the Australian Rock Collective – also known as ARC – which features Spiderbait's Kram, Powderfinger's Darren Middleton and You Am I's Davey Lane. The quartet performs tribute shows to classic albums, including The Beatles' Let It Be and Neil Young's Harvest.

At the end of 2022, Nic was interviewed on a podcast and revealed the band was in talks to reunite in the studio. “Next year is the 20 year anniversary of the release of the first Jet album. We’re actually in discussions right now, sharing musical ideas for the first time with the idea of maybe trying to release some new material next year. This is just as of 3 weeks ago, so we’ll see if it happens or not. It’s looking good so far.”

Activism

The Fred Hollows Foundation
In May 2008, Jet released a video clip on YouTube paying tribute to the work of the late Fred Hollows and The Fred Hollows Foundation. Lead singer Nic Cester says he wanted to highlight that Professor Hollow's work to restore sight to the cataract blind in developing countries was ongoing 15 years after his death. "Fred Hollows was such a big figure in Australia and he had a huge impact, but he passed away when there was still work to do," Cester said in a statement. "This clip is a bit of a reminder, hopefully it encourages people to make a donation to keep Fred's work going." The video tribute features Jet's song "Shine On" along with images compiled by The Fred Hollows Foundation.

In 2007, Jet signed a petition which called for an end to Canada's annual seal hunt.

Band members
Final lineup
 Nic Cester – vocals, rhythm guitar, tambourine ; piano 
 Cameron Muncey – lead guitar, vocals 
 Chris Cester – drums, percussion, vocals ; additional rhythm guitar 
 Mark Wilson – bass guitar, keyboards, harmonica, backing vocals 

Former members
 Doug Armstrong – bass guitar 
 Jason Doukas – keyboards 

Former touring/session musicians
 Stevie Hesketh – keyboards, percussion 
 Louis Macklin – keyboards, percussion 
 The Wolfgramm Sisters – backing vocals 

Timeline

Discography

 Get Born (2003)
 Shine On (2006)
 Shaka Rock (2009)

Awards and nominations

APRA Awards
The APRA Awards are presented annually from 1982 by the Australasian Performing Right Association (APRA).

! R
|-
| 2004 || "Are You Gonna Be My Girl" || Song of the Year ||  ||
|-
| rowspan="5" | 2005 || "Are You Gonna Be My Girl" || Most Performed Australian Work Overseas ||  || 
|-
| "Cold Hard Bitch" || Most Performed Australian Work Overseas ||  || 
|-
| rowspan="2"| "Look What You've Done" || Song of the Year || 
|-
| Most Performed Australian Work || 
|-
| Jet || Songwriters of the Year || 
|-
| rowspan="3" | 2006 || "Are You Gonna Be My Girl" || Most Performed Australian Work Overseas ||  || 
|-
| "Cold Hard Bitch" || Most Performed Australian Work Overseas ||  || 
|-
| "Look What You've Done" || Most Performed Australian Work Overseas || 
|-
| rowspan="2" | 2007 || "Are You Gonna Be My Girl" || Most Performed Australian Work Overseas ||  || 
|-
| "Look What You've Done" || Most Performed Australian Work Overseas ||  || 
|-
| rowspan="3" | 2010 || rowspan="3" | "She's a Genius" || Most Played Australian Work ||  || 
|-
| Rock Work of the Year ||  || 
|-
| Song of the Year ||  || 
|-
| rowspan="2" | 2011 || rowspan="2" | "Seventeen" || Most Played Australian Work ||  || 
|-
| Rock Work of the Year ||  || 
|}

ARIA Music Awards

|-
| rowspan="7" |2004 || rowspan="5" | Get Born || ARIA Award for Album of the Year ||  
|-
| ARIA Award for Best Group ||  
|-
| ARIA Award for Best Rock Album ||  
|-
| ARIA Award for Highest Selling Album ||  
|-
| ARIA Award for Breakthrough Artist - Album ||  
|-
| rowspan="2" | "Are You Gonna Be My Girl" || ARIA Award for Single of the Year || 
|-
| ARIA Award for Breakthrough Artist - Single ||  
|-
| 2005 || Right! Right! Right! || Best Music DVD ||  
|-
| 2007 || Shine On || Best Rock Album ||  
|-
| 2009 || Shaka Rock || Best Rock Album ||  
|}

References

External links

 

2001 establishments in Australia
2012 disestablishments in Australia
APRA Award winners
ARIA Award winners
Atlantic Records artists
Australian alternative rock groups
Australian hard rock musical groups
Musical groups established in 2001
Musical groups disestablished in 2012
Musical groups reestablished in 2016
Musical groups from Melbourne
Musical quartets
Pub rock musical groups
Sibling musical groups